Island council elections were held in the Netherlands Antilles in 1967. They were the fifth elections for the Island Council.

Aruba

Two parties already present in the Council retained representation in the Island Council; the Aruban People's Party (AVP) and the Aruban Patriotic Party (PPA). In addition, the Aruba National Union (UNA) formed a combined list with the Independent Aruban Party (PIA) and Revolutionary Workers' Party (PRO) under the abbreviation UNA-P.P.

Results

Sint Maarten

The Sint Maarten General elections which was scheduled for 1967 to elect the 5 members of the Island Council, never took place because only the incumbent Democratic Party postulated a list.

Results

References

Aruba
Election and referendum articles with incomplete results